PZG or variant may refer to:

 Panzergrenadier (PzG), mechanized infantry, and infantry attached to armoured units
 Polish Golf Union (PZG)
 Pashtun Tahafuz Movement